Jiadong Township (also spelled Jiadung) is a rural township in Pingtung County, Taiwan.

History
Formerly called Katangkha., Jiadong Township was originally the residence of the Makatao people of Pingpu tribe. The first colonists that began arriving into Jiadong were ethnic Hakkas from northeastern Guangdong, establishing the town and ultimately assimilating the local native Makatao aborigines.

Jiadong was the location of the Battle of Chiatung, an engagement in the Japanese invasion of Taiwan. The battle took place on the 11 October 1895, and ended in a Japanese victory and a defeat for the Republic of Formosa. In 1895 the township was described by James W. Davidson as a village "surrounded by a low stone wall loop-holed for rifle fire". He also describes "A body of water, which nearly surrounded the village". During the battle, Japanese forces set several of the houses on fire.

Geography

Administrative divisions

The township comprises 12 villages: Changlong, Datong, Fenglong, Jiadong, Laijia, Liugen, Qiangyuan, Shiguang, Wanjian, Wenfeng, Yanwen and Yuguang.

Tourist attractions
 Old House of Siiao Family
 Yang Family Ancestral Hall

Transportation

 TRA Jiadong Station

Notable natives
 Chung Mong-hong, film director, screenwriter and cinematographer

References

External links

 Jiadong Township Office  

Townships in Pingtung County